Kim Byung-joo (born 7 February 1962 in Yecheon County) is a Korean politician and retired Four star General in the Republic of Korea Army. He was the 27th deputy commander of the ROK/US Combined Forces Command and is a current member of the Korean National Assembly.

Career 
In 1980, he joined the Korea Military Academy and served among others as artillery officer in the Korean Army and liaison officer at the United States Central Command. 2017, he became the first four star general in South Korea with a missile command background and at the same time, he assumed command of the ROK/US Combined Forces Command as deputy commander behind Vincent K. Brooks. He retired in April 2019 and joined the Democratic Party of Korea after the turn of the year. At the 2020 South Korean legislative election, he ran for the Platform Party as candidate number 12 on the party list and got elected.

References

External links 

 General Kim Byung-joo's The Art of War explanation on YouTube (in Korean)

Republic of Korea Army personnel
1962 births
People from Yecheon County
Democratic Party (South Korea, 2000) politicians
Members of the National Assembly (South Korea)
South Korean generals
Living people